Phenomenon is the seventh studio album by rapper LL Cool J. After the success of his previous release Mr. Smith, the same basic principles are followed here, with several R&B-influenced tracks, and a couple of more hardcore rap tracks. The album was certified Platinum, unlike Mr. Smith, which was certified 2× Platinum. The album is executively produced by Sean "Puffy" Combs and therefore features production from his in-house roster of producers The Hitmen.

Track listing

Charts

Certifications

References

1997 albums
LL Cool J albums
Def Jam Recordings albums
Albums produced by Sean Combs
Albums produced by Erick Sermon
Albums produced by Trackmasters